Smith Branch is a  long 2nd order tributary to Reedy Fork in Guilford County, North Carolina.

Course
Smith Branch rises on the Benaja Creek divide about 0.25 miles southeast of Monticello, North Carolina in Guilford County.  Smith Branch then flows south to meet Reedy Fork about 2 miles south of Monticello.

Watershed
Smith Branch drains  of area, receives about 46.0 in/year of precipitation, has a topographic wetness index of 414.95 and is about 42% forested.

References

Rivers of North Carolina
Rivers of Guilford County, North Carolina